Francisco "Fran" Pérez Caso (born 3 January 1986) is a Spanish footballer who plays for UCAM Murcia CF as a central defender.

Football career
Born in Santander, Cantabria, Pérez started his senior career with local amateurs UM Escobedo, in 2005–06. In 2007, he joined SD Lemona in the third division, and two seasons later signed with Barakaldo CF in the same level.

In July 2011, Pérez moved to CD Lugo also from division three. In his first season he contributed with 11 appearances and one goal, with his team being promoted in the playoffs.

Pérez made his debut as a professional on 18 August 2012, playing the full 90 minutes in a 1–0 home win against Hércules CF in the second tier championship. He was released by the Galician club in June 2013, and subsequently moved to Cádiz CF in the third division. 

On 18 August 2014, Pérez signed for fellow league team UCAM Murcia CF.

References

External links

1986 births
Living people
Spanish footballers
Footballers from Santander, Spain
Association football defenders
Segunda División players
Segunda División B players
Tercera División players
SD Lemona footballers
Barakaldo CF footballers
CD Lugo players
Cádiz CF players
UCAM Murcia CF players